Edo, commonly known as Edo State, is a state located in the South-South geopolitical zone of Nigeria. As of 2006 National population census, the state was ranked as the 24th populated state (3,233,366) in Nigeria. The state population figures is expected to be about 8,000,000 in 2022. Edo State is the 22nd largest State by landmass in Nigeria. The state's capital and city, Benin City, is the fourth largest city in Nigeria, and the centre of the country's rubber industry. Created in 1991 from the former Bendel State, is also known as the heart beat of the nation. Edo State borders Kogi State to the northeast, Anambra State to the east, Delta State to the southeast and southsouth and Ondo State to the west.

The modern borders of Edo State encompass region that were formerly the site of various empires and kingdoms formed in the 11th century AD, the Benin Empire. The ancient city of Edo, the site of modern-day Benin City, was home to some of the largest earthworks in the world. In 1897, the British Empire conducted a punitive expedition of the region, destroying most of the ancient city of Edo and incorporating the territory into what would become the Southern Nigeria Protectorate.

Edo State is a diverse state that is predominantly inhabited by the Edoid people, including the Edo (or Bini), Esan, Owan and Afemai people. The most common Edoid language spoken is the Edo language, which is commonly spoken in Benin City. Christianity is the dominant religion in Edo State. It was first introduced to the region by Portuguese missionaries during the 15th century. Islam and traditional religions are also practised.

History 
The Mid-Western Region was a division of Nigeria from 1963 to 1991, formally known as Bendel state from 1976. It was formed in June 1963 from Benin and Delta provinces of the Western Region, and its capital was Benin City. It was renamed a province in 1966, and in 1967 when the other provinces were split up into several states, it remained territorially intact, becoming a state.

During the Nigerian Civil War, the Biafran forces invaded the new Mid-Western state, en route to Lagos, in an attempt to force a quick end to the war. While under Biafran occupation, the state was declared as the “Republic of Benin” as Nigerian forces were to retake the region. The republic collapsed a day after the declaration as Nigerian troops overtook Benin City. Edo State was established on 27 August 1991 when Bendel State was split into Edo and Delta States.

People 

With Benin City as capital, the population of the entire state is approximately 8 million. It is made up of four major ethnic groups; namely Edo (Binis), Owan, Esan and Afemai (Etsako & Akoko Edo). However the State has a high presence of residents from across the country and the world because of its cosmopolitan tendencies. Benin City has a history of being one of the foremost destinations of Europeans during their exploration of Africa continent many centuries ago. Some of these flash points have remained enviable tourists’ attraction sites for the state. The people are known for having several Edo traditional food.

Demographics
The main ethnic groups in Edo State are Bini, Etsako, Esan, Owan, and Akoko Edo. Virtually all the groups trace their origin to Benin City, hence their dialects vary with their distance from Benin City. The Bini speaking people occupy seven out of the 18 Local Government Areas (LGAs) of the state and constitute 57.54% of the total population. Others are as follows: Esan (17.14%), Etsako (12.19%), Owan (7.43%), and Akoko Edo (5.70%). There are also Igbira speaking communities in Akoko Edo, Itsekiri communities in Ikpoba-Okha, and Ijaw Izons and Urhobos in Ovia North East and South West Local Government Areas, especially in the borderlands. Also, Igbo speaking communities exist in Igbanke (Ika) in Orhionmwon LGA.

Governors

Local Government Areas 

Edo State consists of eighteen (18) Local Government Areas. They are:

Akoko-Edo
Egor
Esan Central
Esan North-East
Esan South-East
Esan West
Etsako Central
Etsako East
Etsako West
Igueben
Ikpoba-Okha
Oredo
Orhionmwon
Ovia North-East
Ovia South-West
Owan East
Owan West
Uhunmwonde

Edo State House Of Assembly (Fifth Assembly) Division List, 2013 
Edo State House Of Assembly Division List 2013, consists of twenty-four (24) divisions:

Akoko-Edo 1
Ovia South-West
Orhionmwon I
Etsako East
Uhunmwode
Esan South-East
Esan Central
Esan West
Igueben
Oredo West
Esan North-East I
Ikpoba-Okha
Etsako West I
Owan East
Orhionmwon II
Etsako Central
Owan West
Egor
Esan North-East II
Akoko-Edo II
Ovia North-East II
Oredo East
Ovia North-East I
Etsako West II

Edo State Judiciary 
The Judiciary is the third arm of Government in the State, vested with the power to interprete the laws and resolve disputes in both civil and criminal matters in the State. The State Judiciary is headed by a Chief Judge. On the 16 of May, 2021, Edo State Governor, Godwin Obaseki swore in Justice Joe Acha as Acting Chief Judge of Edo State, following the retirement of Justice Esther Edigin

Politics 
Governor Godwin Obaseki is the current governor of Edo State and was sworn into office on the 12th November, 2016. His deputy is Rt. Hon. Comrade Philip Shaibu. The Edo State House of Assembly is the legislative body.

Electoral System 
The electoral  system of each state is selected using a modified two-round system. To be elected in the first round, a candidate must receive the plurality of the vote and over 25% of the vote in at least two -third of the State local government Areas. If no candidate passes threshold, a second round will be held between the top candidate and the next candidate to have received a plurality of votes in the highest number of local government Areas.

Languages
English is the official language of the state. The major tribal languages spoken in the state are Edo, Yoruba, Etuno, Etsako, Esan Ake-Ievbu and Okpamheri. Edo State is home to several ethnicities, they are the Edo, Okpe, Esan, Afemai, Akoko, Igbanke, Emai.

The Etsako/Afemai people of Edo state have the highest population of Muslims. They live in Six local government areas within the state and their major occupation is farming.

Languages of Edo State listed by LGA:

Religion Practiced In Edo State
Christianity and Islam are the major religion Practiced in Edo State, although minority of the population are traditional worshippers.

Economy
Tourist attractions in Edo State include the Emotan Statue in Benin City, Ise Lake and River Niger Beach in Agenebode, Etsako-East; Mike Akhigbe Square at fugar, Ambrose Alli Square, Ekpoma, River Niger Beaches at Ilushi, BFFM Building at Ewu, Igun Bronze Caster at Igun Street in Benin City, College of Agriculture and Aqua Culture Technology, Agenebode, Okpekpe with its hills and scenes and the Usomege Hills at Apana-Uzairue, Somorika hills in Akoko Edo, where a government-run tourist center at Ososo is set among spectacular scenery.

The state produces crude oil, and other mineral resources like limestone and quarry. The state has a cement factory at Okpella and a Flour Mill at Ewu which is moribund.

Mineral Resources In Edo State
The following are the Mineral Resources found in Edo State
 Bitumen
 Clay
 Dolomite
 Phosphate
 Glass-sand
 Gold
 Gypsium
 Iron-ore
 Lignite
 Limestone
 Marble
 Oil/Gas

Education 
Notable tertiary learning institutions in Edo state include:

 Auchi Polytechnic
 Ambrose Alli University, Ekpoma
 Benson Idahosa University, Benin City
 Edo State Polytechnic Usen
 Edo Technical College
Edo State University, Uzairue (formerly Edo University, Iyahmo)
 Igbinedion University, Okada
 Kings Polytechnic
 Mudiame University, Irrua
 Samuel Adegboyega University, Ogwa
 Shaka Polytechnic
 University of Benin (UNIBEN)
 Wellspring University
College of Education, Ekiadolor
College of Agriculture, Iguoriakhi

Healthcare 

List of Edo State Medical zones and associated local government areas.

Notable people

Oba of Benin
 John Odigie Oyegun, First Governor of Edo state and former national chairman of the ruling APC
Godwin Obaseki, former chairman of the State's economic team and present Executive Governor of the State
Jeffrey Obomeghie, chief executive officer of the International Hospitality Institute and Writer
Erhabor Emokpae, pioneer of modern arts in Nigeria
Admiral Mike Akhigbe, former vice president of the Federal Republic of Nigeria.
Dele Giwa, Nigerian journalist, editor and founder of Newswatch magazine.
Senator Albert Legogie, former deputy senate president in the defunct Third Republic and a pioneer member of the Board of Trustees of the Peoples Democratic Party (PDP).
Pa Michael Imoudu, labour leader and founder of the Nigeria state,
Chief Julius Momo Udochi, the first Nigerian ambassador to the United States,
Gen. George Agbazika Innih, who was one-time military governor of Bendel and Kwara State,
 Major-General Abdul Rahman Mamudu former Commander Nigerian Army Signals Corps and military administrator Gongola State,
Aigboje Aig-Imoukhuede, cofounder of Access Bank Plc and founder of Africa Initiative for Governance (AIG)
Adams Oshiomhole, past president of the Nigeria Labour Congress and former governor of Edo State; he built Edo University of Iyamoh, Edo State.
Pastor Chris Oyakhilome, founder of the Believers Loveworld Nation
Prince Tony Momoh, former Minister of Information and Culture
Maymunah Kadiri, Nigerian mental health advocate
Commander Anthony Ikhazoboh, minister of sports and transport
Professor Ambrose Alli, former governor of the defunct Bendel State. He created the Bendel State university now named after him.
John Momoh, Nigerian broadcast journalist and CEO of Channels TV
Professor Osayuki Godwin Oshodin, former vice chancellor of University of Benin
Jacob U. Egharevba, a Bini historian and traditional chief
 Dr Samuel Ogbemudia, former governor of the midwest region of Nigeria and later Bendel state
Chief Anthony Enahoro, anti-colonial and pro-democracy activist and politician
Professor Festus Iyayi, novelist and first African to win the Commonwealth Writers Prize
Odia Ofeimun, poet and former president of the Association of Nigerian Authors
Dr Abel Guobadia, educator and former Nigerian ambassador to the Republic of Korea, former Chairman Independent National Electoral Commission (INEC)
General Godwin Abbe, former Nigerian Minister for Interior and Defence
Archbishop John Edokpolo, founder of Edokpolo Grammar Schools and Political Activist
Sir Victor Uwaifo, musician
Archbishop Benson Idahosa, Pentecostal Church Leader
Sonny Okosun, musician
Augustine Eguavoen, former professional Nigerian footballer and coach
Felix Idubor, artist
Festus Ezeli, basketball player formerly with the Golden State Warriors
Modupe Ozolua, body enhancement and reconstructive surgery
Chief Tony Anenih, chairman of board of trustees (PDP) Once Minister of Work.
Gabriel Igbinedion, international business mogul and bini high chief and owner of ITV
Raymond Dokpesi, owner of Africa largest private television network and politician
Lancelot Oduwa Imasuen, film director, screenwriter and producer
Suyi Davies Okungbowa, fantasy and speculative fiction author
Osaze Peter Odemwingie, professional footballer
Chris Aire-Iluobe, jeweler and timepiece designer
Francis Edo-Osagie, businessman
Kamaru Usman, professional mixed martial artist, former UFC Welterweight Champion.
Yakubu Ayegbeni, former professional footballer
Rema (Nigerian musician), musician signed to Mavin Records,
Philip Shaibu (born 1 December 1969, in Kaduna) an alumnus of University of Jos is a Nigerian lawmaker, politician and business man. He is currently the Deputy Governor of Edo State, Nigeria.
Eghosa Asemota Agbonifo, politician, coordinator of Michael Agbonifo shoe a child foundation
Prof T. M. Yesufu, pioneer Vice-Chancellor of the University of Benin, economist.
Odion Jude Ighalo, Nigerian professional footballer.
Victor Osimhen, Nigerian professional footballer.
Aisha Yesufu, Nigerian socio-political activist.
Yvonne Jegede is a Nigerian actress, film producer, model, and television personality; notable for producing 3 is Company.
Zakariyau Oseni, prominent professor of Arabic and a scholar of Islamic studies, guardian of Arabic language and literature, an imam and poet.
Mike Ozekhome, legal practitioner and a human rights activist.
Mike Oghiadomhe, chief of staff to President Goodluck Jonathan in 2014.
Solomon Arase, former and 18th inspector general of police in Nigeria under President Goodluck Jonathan government.
Julius Aghahowa, former professional footballer for Nigeria.
Sam Loco Efe (1945-2011), former Nollywood veteran actor and producer.
Admiral Augustus Aikhomu, former chief of staff in the General Ibrahim Babangida administration.
Helen Paul, stand-up comedian and actress and popularly known as Tatafo. One time face of the Telecom consumer by the Nigerian Communications Commission (NCC).
Lancelot Oduwa Imasuen, film director and Nollywood producer. Established the first Benin film academy at Igbinedion University, Okada, Edo State.
Hon. Joe Edionwele, a politician and member of the 8th and 9th National Assembly, Nigeria representing Edo Central Senatorial District
Lucky Igbinedion a politician and former democratic governor of Edo State.
Oserheimen Osunbor, a lawyer and one time Governor of the State. He is from Esan West Local Government Area of Edo State.
Osagie Ehanire Nigerian medical doctor and politician
Skales Nigerian rapper, singer and songwriter.
Nancy Isime Nigerian Actress, model and media personality.
Adesua Etomi Nigerian Actress
Queen Blessing Ebigieson Nigerian Actress
BB02 Nigerian Musician
Loretta Ogboro-Okor
Peter Akpatason, a politician

References

Works cited

External links

Edo State Open Data Portal
Edo State Civil Service Commission

 
States of Nigeria
States and territories established in 1991
1991 establishments in Nigeria